Roel Buikema (born 22 March 1976 in Amsterdam) is a retired Dutch footballer who played as a midfielder for MVV, Helmond Sport, Heracles Almelo, Excelsior, FC Den Bosch and VVV-Venlo.

Club career
Buikema played for amateur side Quick in The Hague during his youth years.
During his first season in professional football, 1996–97, he won the Eerste Divisie with MVV. Subsequently, he made 14 appearances in the Eredivisie during the 1997–98 and 1998–99 seasons. Afterwards, he exclusively played in the Eerste Divisie, despite winning promotion to the Eredivisie three more times (with Heracles Almelo in 2004–05, with Excelsior in 2005–06 although he was loaned out to FC Den Bosch three months into the season, and as a loanee with VVV-Venlo in 2006–07 after playoffs).

Honours
MVV
Eerste Divisie winner: 1996–97
Heracles Almelo
Eerste Divisie winner: 2004–05
Excelsior
Eerste Divisie winner: 2005–06

References

1976 births
Living people
Footballers from Amsterdam
Dutch footballers
Association football midfielders
MVV Maastricht players
Helmond Sport players
Heracles Almelo players
Excelsior Rotterdam players
FC Den Bosch players
VVV-Venlo players
Eerste Divisie players
Eredivisie players